Captain Ernest Morrow (189701949) was a Canadian flying ace during World War I. He was credited with seven aerial victories while flying a Bristol F.2 Fighter. His military career was cut short by a severe wounding that cost him his left lower leg, while earning him a Distinguished Flying Cross for valour.

Early life
Ernest Morrow was born on 21 January 1897 in Waubaushene, Canada. the son of Elizabeth Ward and Joseph Morrow. He was living in Toronto and working as an accountant at the time of his enlistment into military service.

World War I
Morrow enlisted during May 1917. He was commissioned as a second lieutenant in the Royal Flying Corps on 22 September 1917. He was then posted to No. 62 Squadron RFC on 30 October 1917, and shipped out to France with this unit. The haste with which he was commissioned and posted indicates that he took at least some of his aviation training during the Summer of 1917.

He scored his first aerial victory on 26 March 1918. After scoring three wins, he was hospitalized for a short while beginning 29 June 1918. He returned to winning form on 10 August 1918, driving down two German Pfalz D.III fighters to become an ace.

Morrow's final sortie is vividly described in the award citation for his Distinguished Flying Cross:

"On the 22nd August, whilst leading an offensive patrol, this officer attacked ten Fokker biplanes and Pfalz scouts, driving down one in flames. In the engagement he was wounded and became unconscious; regaining consciousness, he found that his machine had got into a spin and was on fire. With a supreme effort, although very weak, he succeeded in landing within our lines, where he was with great difficulty extricated from the burning machine."

Having crashlanded near Ficheux, France, with bullet wounds to the leg, Morrow was dragged from the flaming wreckage by his observer, Louis Mark Thompson. Morrow's left lower leg was subsequently amputated.

Both Thompson and Morrow were recommended for the Distinguished Flying Cross. The latter's award was gazetted on 2 November 1918, well after his 5 September medical evacuation to England.

List of aerial victories
See also Aerial victory standards of World War I

Post World War I
Ernest Morrow gave up his commission because of ill health caused by wounds, retaining the honorary rank of captain, on 8 January 1919. He would live until 20 July 1949, dying in his hometown of Waubaushene.

References
 Above the Trenches: A Complete Record of the Fighter Aces and Units of the British Empire Air Forces 1915-1920. Christopher F. Shores, Norman L. R. Franks, Russell Guest. Grub Street, 1990. , 9780948817199.

Endnotes

1897 births
1949 deaths
People from Simcoe County
Canadian flying aces
Recipients of the Distinguished Flying Cross (United Kingdom)
Canadian amputees